KSWF (100.5 FM) is a radio station broadcasting a Country format. Licensed to Aurora, Missouri, United States, it serves the Springfield, Missouri, area.  The station is currently owned by iHeartMedia, Inc. and licensed as iHM Licenses, LLC. The station is the former KGMY-FM and used to brand itself as "MyCountry 100.5," but later rebranded as "100.5 The Wolf."

External links
 

Country radio stations in the United States
SWF
Radio stations established in 1984
IHeartMedia radio stations